Fernando Lanhas, GOSE (16 September 1923 – 4 February 2012) was a Portuguese painter and architect.

Lanhas was born and died in Porto.  He studied architecture but became known as the leading name in Portuguese abstract painting. He started painting in 1944, influenced by music, astronomy, and the international abstract movement. Since then, he's been one of the most innovative and original Portuguese painters.

External links
Fernando Lanhas Biography at the Calouste Gulbenkian Foundation Official Site (Portuguese) 
 Fernando Lanhas, Former Student of Porto Fine Arts School

References 

1923 births
2012 deaths
Portuguese painters
Portuguese male painters
Portuguese architects
University of Porto alumni
Artists from Porto